The eighth series of the British comedy-drama television series Cold Feet aired on the ITV network during January 2019.

Cast

Main
 James Nesbitt as Adam Williams
 Robert Bathurst as David Marsden
 Hermione Norris as Karen Marsden
 John Thomson as Pete Gifford
 Fay Ripley as Jenny Gifford
 Ceallach Spellman as Matt Williams

Supporting
 Jacey Salles as Ramona Ramirez
 Daisy Edgar-Jones as Olivia Marsden
 Sylvie Briggs as Ellie Marsden
 Jack Harper as Adam Gifford
 Madeleine Edmondson as Chloe Gifford
 Siobhan Finneran as Nikki Kirkbright
 Lucy Robinson as Robyn Duff
 Eve Myles as Karen's friend and Adam's love interest - Caitlin Henderson

Guest

Episodes

Production
ITV commissioned an eighth series of Cold Feet, the third since its 2016 revival, on 30 October 2017. The series began filming in Manchester on 19 March 2018 and continued until July. It will begin airing in January 2019.

References

External links 
 

2019 British television seasons